Salome, also known as Salome II, was the daughter of Herod the Great (Herod I) and one of his lesser wives, Elpis, born in ~14 BCE. She should not be confused with Salome, whose mother was Herodias, and who is alleged to have played a role in the death of John the Baptist. Her fate, along with her mother's, is unknown.

References

Herodian dynasty
1st-century BC births
Herod the Great
Year of death unknown
1st-century BC women
Ancient Jewish women